Wyard Township is a township in Foster County, North Dakota, United States. It is known for the artificial lake Wyard Dam, used for recreational purposes, and unofficially known as the Kiwanis Dam.

References

External links
US Census
City-data.com
Wyard township

Townships in Foster County, North Dakota
Townships in North Dakota